Australian singer, songwriter and guitarist Ed Kuepper co-founded and recorded with the punk band The Saints, the experimental post-punk group Laughing Clowns and the grunge-like The Aints. 

He has also released 18 solo albums  as well as another 14 limited-release albums of live and broadcast performances.

Kuepper has won two ARIA Music Awards for Best Independent Album—Black Ticket Day (1992) and Serene Machine (1993). His highest chart placing was with Honey Steel's Gold (1991), which reached No.28 on the national album chart.

Albums

Studio albums

Soundtrack albums

Live albums

Compilation albums

Limited release mail order albums

Charting singles

References

Rock music discographies
Ed Kuepper albums